Inspector of Bombers (German language: Inspekteur der Kampfflieger) was not a rank but a leading position within the High Command of the German Luftwaffe (Oberkommando der Luftwaffe) in Nazi Germany. The inspector was responsible for the readiness, training and tactics of the German bomber force. It was not an operational command. The senior commander position of this unit was renamed to General of Bombers (General der Kampfflieger) in 1942.

Inspectors

|-style="text-align:center;"
| colspan=6| Inspekteur der Kampfflieger

|-style="text-align:center;"
| colspan=6| General der Kampfflieger

References
 Rohde, Jens (2001). Auf Gedeih und Verderb - Eine deutsche Flugzeugbesatzung im 2. Weltkrieg. BoD – Books on Demand. .

Luftwaffe
Military ranks of Germany